Yoder is an unincorporated community in Reno County, Kansas, United States.  As of the 2020 census, the population of the community and nearby areas was 165.  It is located approximately 10 miles southeast of the city of Hutchinson on K-96.  Although Yoder is unincorporated, with no city government, it does have a U.S. Post Office and its own ZIP code (67585).  Yoder is the hub of a local Amish community.

History
The community derives its name from its Amish founder, Valentine Yoder.

The first post office in Yoder was established in November 1889.

The community was home to the former Naval Air Station Hutchinson, later renamed to Hutchinson Air Force Station, and currently named as Sunflower Aerodrome Gliderport.

Geography

Climate
The climate in this area is characterized by hot, humid summers and generally mild to cool winters.  According to the Köppen Climate Classification system, Yoder has a humid subtropical climate, abbreviated "Cfa" on climate maps.

Demographics

For statistical purposes, the United States Census Bureau has defined Yoder as a census-designated place (CDP).

Education
The community is served by Haven USD 312 public school district.

Area events
Yoder Heritage Day takes place annually on the fourth Saturday in August.

Gallery

References

Further reading

External links

 Community of Yoder
 Yoder Heritage Day.
 "Yoder Amish Settlement". Amish State Guide.
 Reno County maps: Current, Historic, KDOT

Census-designated places in Reno County, Kansas
Amish in the United States
Populated places established in 1889
Census-designated places in Kansas
1889 establishments in Kansas